Tenney Mountain is a mountain near Plymouth, New Hampshire.

References

Mountains of Grafton County, New Hampshire
Mountains of New Hampshire